Antonín Žalský is a Czech shot putter.  He was born in Jilemnice, Liberecký kraj, Czech Republic on 7 August 1980.

Achievements

References
 
 

1980 births
Living people
Czech male shot putters
Olympic athletes of the Czech Republic
Athletes (track and field) at the 2004 Summer Olympics
Athletes (track and field) at the 2012 Summer Olympics
People from Jilemnice
Sportspeople from the Liberec Region